Kuhl may refer to:

People 
 Carolyn Kuhl (born 1952), American judge
 Chad Kuhl (born 1992), American professional baseball pitcher for the Pittsburgh Pirates
 Charles Kuhl (1915–1971), the US Army soldier who was famously slapped by General George S. Patton
 Don Kuhl, a politician from Manitoba, Canada
 Ellen Kuhl, German biomechanical engineer
 Ernst Kuhl (1843–1911), German engineer
 Heinrich Kuhl (1797–1821), German zoologist
 Hermann von Kuhl (1856–1958), Prussian military officer and General der Infanterie in World War I
 Patricia K. Kuhl, Professor of Speech and Hearing Sciences at the University of Washington
 Randy Kuhl (born 1943), Republican member of the United States House of Representatives from New York
 Walter Frederick Kuhl (1905–1991), teacher and a Canadian federal politician

Flora and fauna
 Kuhl's creek frog (Limnonectes kuhlii), a species of frog in the family Ranidae
 Kuhl's deer (Axis kuhlii), a species of deer
 Kuhl's Flying Gecko (Ptychozoon kuhli), a species of gecko
 Kuhl's lorikeet (Vini kuhlii), a species of lorikeet
 Kuhl's pipistrelle (Pipistrellus kuhlii),  a species of vesper bat
 Kuhl's Stingray (Neotrygon kuhlii), a species of stingray

Media 
 KUHL (1440 AM), a radio station licensed to Santa Maria, California, USA
 KTNK, a radio station known as KUHL from 2006 to 2009, licensed to Lompoc, California, USA

See also 
 Kühl
 Kuehl
 Kuhler